Fustian is a variety of heavy cloth woven from cotton, chiefly prepared for menswear.  It is also used figuratively to refer to pompous, inflated or pretentious writing or speech, from at least the time of Shakespeare. This literary use is because the cloth type was often used as padding, hence, the purposeless words are fustian.

History and use 
 
Known in Late Latin as fustaneum or fustanum and in Medieval Latin as pannus fustāneus ('fustian cloth') or tela fustānea ('fustian mesh'), the cloth is possibly named after the Egyptian city of Fustat near Cairo that manufactured such a material.

It embraces plain twilled cloth known as jean, and cut fabrics similar to velvet, known as velveteen, moleskin, corduroy etc. The original medieval fustian was a stout but respectable cloth with a cotton weft and a linen warp. By the early 20th century, fustians were usually of cotton dyed various colours.

In a petition to Parliament during the reign of Mary I, "fustian of Naples" is mentioned. In the 13th and 14th centuries priests' robes and women's dresses were made of fustian, but though dresses are still made from some kinds, the chief use is for labourers' clothes. From the mid 1600s to the mid 1700s, fustian was often used for bed hangings.

Fustian, by the 1860s, referred to any cut weft cotton fabric, and its manufacture was common in towns of the fringe of the Lancashire cotton region, such as Congleton in Cheshire, Mow Cop in Staffordshire and Heptonstall in Calderdale.
From 1800 to 1850 it was commonly called Baragan Fustian, and much used in Australia.

Manufacture 

Fustian cutting was a laborious process using a fustian cutting knife. It was inserted along the fabric alongside two warp threads, and under the raised weft, and as it was guided forward the blade severed the weft. In corduroy, there were seven ridges to the inch, so along a  bolt, there would be about 320 cuts to be done.

In recent times the cloth was tensioned over a  table where all the cuts were made, and then the cloth would be released and the next two yards tensioned onto the table. Over a 60-hour week the cutter would be expected to produce  of 7–8 ridge corduroy. Velveteen was cut the same way but had 32 ridges per inch, so production would be proportionately less.

Cutting was one part of the process. The yarn was sized and the cloth was woven—there would be a high number of weft threads to warp. The ridges were manually cut, and the cloth sent to be finished. It was scoured to remove the size, and brushed to raise the nap. This was then singed over a gas flame, then bleached and or dyed. It was brushed again. It was now stentered to pull it out to the standard width. The back of the cloth would now be filled to give it stiffness: this could be with a glue-based mixture made from boiled bones, although each manufacturer had its own techniques. The cloth was now ready to be taken to the warehouse to be sold.

Political significance
Fustian was worn by workers during the 19th century. Accordingly, radical elements of the British working class chose to wear fustian jackets as a symbol of their class allegiance. This was especially marked during the Chartist era. The historian Paul Pickering has called the wearing of fustian "a statement of class without words."

Fustian also refers to pompous, inflated or pretentious writing or speech, starting from the time of Shakespeare. This literary use arose because the cloth type was often used as padding, hence, the purposeless words are fustian. Bombast, plant fibre used directly as padding (and not as fabric), has a similar literary meaning.

See also 
Barragan (cloth), Spanish term describing a variety of medieval textiles
Evolution of blue jeans
Fustanella, a skirt-like men's garment

Notes

References

Pickering, Paul, A., "Class Without Words: Symbolic Communication in the Chartist Movement", Past and Present, cxii, August 1986, 144–162.

British clothing
Cotton industry
Linen industry
Pile fabrics
Woven fabrics